Jung Bo-min (born June 17, 1997) is a South Korean actress.

Filmography

Television series

Web series

References

External links
 
 

1997 births
Living people
21st-century South Korean actresses
South Korean television actresses
South Korean web series actresses